is a Shinto shrine in Takanawa, Minato, Tokyo, Japan. The shrine was established in 1594 at the order of Tokugawa Ieyasu.

Gallery

Shinto shrines in Tokyo
Buildings and structures in Minato, Tokyo

References 

1594 establishments in Japan
1594 establishments in Asia